Fusha Sportive Adriatik is a multi-use stadium in Velipojë, Shkodër District, Albania. The stadium has a capacity of 1000 people and was called Fusha Sportive Velipojë prior to its renovation in 2010. It is the home ground of KS Ada Velipojë.

References

Football venues in Albania
Buildings and structures in Shkodër